Jesse Warn is an American television director, film director, and screenwriter. He is well known for his work on the Starz drama Spartacus and for The CW's The Originals, Arrow, The Flash and Supergirl. Warn also directed and made his screenwriting debut in the film Nemesis Game.

Career
He began his career writing and directing the 1999 short film 9 Across, starring Rena Owen. In 2000, he wrote and directed his second short film, Little Samurai.

He then segued to television work, directing for series such as, Legend of the Seeker, V, Criminal Minds, The Vampire Diaries, The Originals and True Blood.

Spartacus
Having had directed the first installment of the Starz mini-series Spartacus: Gods of the Arena, "Past Transgressions", Warn was hired as a director for the sequel series Spartacus: War of the Damned. He ultimately directed eight episodes ("The Thing in the Pit", "Great and Unfortunate Things", "Kill Them All", "A Place in This World", "Sacramentum", "Wrath of the Gods", "Wolves at the Gate", "Mors Indecepta").

Arrow, The Flash and Supergirl 
In winter 2014, Warn directed his first episode of the DC Comics produced Green Arrow origin series Arrow, which was episode 19, of season 2, "The Man Under the Hood", and featured characters crossing over from the series' impending spin-off, The Flash.

Warn directed the third episode of The Flashs first season, "Things You Can't Outrun", which featured the introduction of future-superhero Ronnie Raymond.

He directed the 8th episode of Arrow'''s 3rd season, "The Brave and the Bold", which again featured a crossover event with The Flash''. It also introduced the supervillain Digger Harkness/Captain Boomerang. His next helming episode was with the season's twelfth, "Uprising". It explored the motivations and genesis of The Dark Archer/Malcolm Merlyn. He directed the 17th installment of the year, "Suicidal Tendencies", from a script by co-producer Keto Shimizu. It saw the reformation of Task Force X, with new member Cupid/Carrie Cutter; and explored the past of Deadshot.

Arrow Credits;
2.19: The Man under the Hood,
3.8: The Brave and the Bold,
3.12: Uprising,
3.17: Suicidal Tendencies,
4.10: Blood Debts,
5.23: Lian Yu.

The Flash Credits;
1.3: Thing's You Can't Out Run,
2.2: Flash of Two Worlds,
2.22: Invincible,
3.1: Flashpoint.

Supergirl Credits;
1.6: Red Faced,
3.1: Girl of Steel,
3.4 The Faithful,
3.10 Legion of Superheroes,
3.13 Both Sides Now,
3.17 Trinity,
3.23 Battles Lost and Won,
4.1 American Alien,
4.3 Man of Steel,
4.9 Elseworlds, Part 3,
4.22 The Quest for Peace,
5.1 Event Horzion,
5.9 Crisis on Infnite Earths, Part 1,
5.13 It's a Super Life,
6.1 Rebirth,
6.2 A Few Good Women,
6.10 Still I Rise,
6.17 I Believe in a Thing Called Love, and
6.20 Kara

References

External links

American film directors
American television directors
American screenwriters
Living people
Place of birth missing (living people)
Year of birth missing (living people)